Marlo Louis Weich (born ) is a South African rugby union player for Russian team Enisei-STM in the Rugby Premier League and the European Rugby Challenge Cup. His regular position is fullback.

References

South African rugby union players
Living people
1995 births
Rugby union fullbacks
SWD Eagles players
Rugby union players from Limpopo